Ahmed Mohamed Salem was an Egyptian footballer. He competed at the 1924 Summer Olympics and the 1928 Summer Olympics.

References

External links
 

Year of birth missing
Year of death missing
Egyptian footballers
Egypt international footballers
Olympic footballers of Egypt
Footballers at the 1924 Summer Olympics
Footballers at the 1928 Summer Olympics
Place of birth missing
Association football defenders